T. laxa may refer to:
 Trabecula laxa, a sea snail species found in the Gulf of Mexico
 Trichopilia laxa, an orchid species found from western South America to Venezuela
 Triteleia laxa, the Ithuriel's spear or grassnut, a lily species native to California

See also 
 Laxa (disambiguation)